XOD is a visual programming language for microcontrollers, started in 2016. As a supported platform, XOD started with Arduino boards compatibility and Raspberry Pi. It is free and open-source software released under the GNU Affero General Public License, version 3.0.

Basics 
The basic elements of XOD programming are nodes. XOD is based on functional reactive programming principles and provides graphical flow-based application programming interface. XOD can compile a native machine code for the low-ended controllers. A node is a block that represents either some physical device like a sensor, motor, or relay, or some operation such as addition, comparison, or text concatenation. XOD is also able to let the user build up some missing node using other nodes, without switching to textual programming.

Analogs 
Node-RED and NoFlo are the closest analogs of XOD.

References

External links 

Arduino
Visual programming languages